Hackel is the surname of several people:

A. W. Hackel (1882 – 1959), American film producer
Chris Hackel, (born 1987), Mauritian swimmer
David Hackel, American television producer and writer
Eduard Hackel (1850 – 1926), Austrian botanist
Mark Hackel, County Executive of Macomb County, Michigan

See also
Haeckel (disambiguation), both for Haeckel and Häckel
Hackl